Circulocolumella is a genus of fungus in the Hysterangiaceae family. The genus is monotypic, containing the single species Circulocolumella hahashimensis, found in the Bonin Islands of Japan, and is now extinct.

References

External links
 

Hysterangiales
Fungi of Asia
Monotypic Basidiomycota genera